Tom Rogan (born 8 February 1986) is a political journalist based in Washington, D.C.

Career
Rogan grew up and was educated in London, in the United Kingdom. He attended St John's School, Leatherhead for secondary school/high school before attaining a BA in War Studies from King's College London, an MSc in Middle Eastern Politics from the School of Oriental and African Studies, and a Graduate Diploma in Law from The College of Law in London.

Though he grew up in the United Kingdom, his political career began in the United States when he worked as an intern in Washington, D.C., during the 2004 US Presidential Campaign. He also had a short stint working for a British Member of Parliament, Humfrey Malins, during 2005.

His first television appearances were in the United Kingdom, as a commentator on US and international politics on news outlets such as BBC and Sky News during the 2012 US Presidential Election. In 2012 he moved to Washington, D.C.

He has contributed to news organisations, including The Week, The Spectator, The Weekly Standard, Reuters, The American Spectator, The Daily Caller, Fox News, The Washington Times, USA Today, CNN, The Christian Science Monitor, The Atlantic, The Commentator, The Telegraph, The Guardian  and The Huffington Post. He is a columnist for the National Review and Opportunity Lives. In 2014, he began making increasingly frequent TV appearances as a pundit/commentator on news outlets such as Fox News and CNN. A specialist in Middle-Eastern politics and US foreign policy, he featured regularly as a commentator on various news outlets during the initial uprising of ISIS in 2014, occasionally making multiple TV appearances a day. He has appeared twice on the HBO show, Real Time with Bill Maher.

In August 2014 he was chosen as the inaugural chair of the ‘Tony Blankley Chair for Public Policy and American Exceptionalism’ award by the Steamboat Institute, a conservative political group based in Steamboat Springs, Colorado, in memory of political analyst Tony Blankley.

In 2014 he was a frequent guest panelist on The McLaughlin Group, becoming a regular panelist in 2015. He became a mentee of John McLaughlin and the two developed a very close relationship. At John McLaughlin's funeral, Rogan was one of the first speakers  and maintains a close relationship with the McLaughlin family.

In 2017, Rogan joined the Washington Examiner  as a commentary writer.

In August 2017, a pilot episode of a proposed revival of The McLaughlin Group with Rogan as moderator was taped and published on YouTube. On January 8, 2018, The McLaughlin Group relaunched with Rogan as moderator. In contrast to the previous format in which there were four semi-permanent panelists, the new version features a rotating guest each week. The show aired on WJLA-TV, the local ABC affiliate for the greater Washington, D.C. area, for a few months, then became available online only. After going into hiatus in January 2019, the show returned to the air, with Rogan as moderator and the same format, in September 2019 on Maryland Public Television, which began distribution of the show to PBS stations nationally in January 2020. In November 2019, the show introduced a "Web Exclusive" moderated by Rogan and available online, consisting of additional discussions not included in the weekly television broadcast.

Article about the Crimean Bridge
On May 15, 2018 Tom published an article in the newspaper Washington Examiner titled "Ukraine should blow up Putin's Crimea bridge". In his article, Rogan says that the Ukrainian air force should bomb the Crimean Bridge, and that the US should support this.  He also claims that the length of the bridge would reduce the number of casualties among those crossing at the time of the attack. The article provoked a strong reaction in Russia, instantly turning the Washington Examiner into the most frequently cited periodical. Many spoke about the article, including the Vice Speaker of the Russian Parliament Irina Yarovaya; and the Russian Embassy to the United States demanded an explanation from Tom Rogan. On 17 May, the Investigative Committee of Russia opened a criminal investigation against Tom Rogan, accusing him of calling for terrorism. Tom Rogan reacted with his new article in Washington Examiner titled "Why Putin wants to send me to the Black Dolphin" and he received support in the editorial "Our response to Russia's threats against our journalists". In the latter it was stated, that Rogan's piece is "an opinion on how one sovereign nation ought to respond to aggression". On May 18, the Investigative Committee opened criminal case against the editor of the Washington Examiner, Hugo Gurdon, too.

References

External links
 Tom Rogan Thinks..., blog
 

American political commentators
American political writers
1986 births
Living people
Alumni of King's College London
American male journalists
21st-century American journalists
People educated at St John's School, Leatherhead